Mestni Stadion (Slovene for "City Stadium") can refer to:
Ptuj City Stadium
Izola City Stadium
Fazanerija City Stadium
Zagorje City Stadium
Ajdovščina Stadium
Rajko Štolfa Stadium, old name for Stadion Rajko Štolfa
Lendava Sports Park, old name for Športni park Lendava
Stanko Mlakar Stadium, old name for Športni Center Kranj